Chondria is a red alga genus in the family Rhodomelaceae.

Species

 Chondria acanthophora C.Agardh
 Chondria acrorhizophora Setchell & N.L.Gardner
 Chondria angustata Kylin
 Chondria angustissima Gordon-Mills & Womersley
 Chondria arborescens (J.Agardh) De Toni
 Chondria arcuata Hollenberg
 Chondria armata var. plumaris Børgesen
 Chondria armata (Kützing) Okamura
 Chondria articulata var. linearis C.Agardh
 Chondria articulata var. gracilis C.Agardh
 Chondria atropurpurea Harvey
 Chondria baileyana (Montagne) Harvey
 Chondria bernardii P.[J.L.] Dangeard
 Chondria boryana (De Notaris ex J.Agardh) De Toni
 Chondria botryoides C.Agardh
 Chondria bulbosa Harvey
 Chondria bullata N'Yuert & Payri
 Chondria californica (Collins) Kylin
 Chondria capensis (Harvey) Askenasy
 Chondria capillaris (Hudson) M.J.Wynne
 Chondria capreolis Gordon-Mills & Womersley
 Chondria cartilaginea (J.Agardh) De Toni
 Chondria chejuensis Y.-P.Lee
 Chondria clarionensis Setchell & N.L.Gardner
 Chondria clavata (Sonder) Harvey
 Chondria clavata var. dendroides Harvey
 Chondria clavellosa var. lyngbyei C.Agardh
 Chondria clavellosa (Turner) C.Agardh
 Chondria cnicophylla (Melvill) De Toni
 Chondria coerulescens (J.Agardh) Falkenberg
 Chondria collinsiana M.A.Howe
 Chondria complanata Suhr
 Chondria compressa Papenfuss
 Chondria concrescens E.Y.Dawson
 Chondria confusa G.W.Lawson & D.M.John
 Chondria constricta M.Tani & Masuda
 Chondria corallorhiza (J.Agardh) Falkenberg
 Chondria cornuta Børgesen
 Chondria corynephora Harvey
 Chondria crassicaulis Harvey
 Chondria curdieana (Harvey ex J.Agardh) De Toni
 Chondria curvilineata F.S.Collins & Hervey
 Chondria dangeardii E.Y.Dawson
 Chondria dasyphylla var. pyrifera J Agardh
 Chondria dasyphylla var. intermedia (Grunow) P.C.Silva
 Chondria dasyphylla f. floridana F.S.Collins
 Chondria dasyphylla var. sedifolia Harvey
 Chondria dasyphylla var. stellata Børgesen
 Chondria dasyphylla (Woodward) C.Agardh
 Chondria debilis Harvey
 Chondria decidua Tani & Masuda
 Chondria decipiens Kylin
 Chondria decumbens Weber-van Bosse
 Chondria delilei C.Agardh
 Chondria densa P.[J.L.] Dangeard
 Chondria econstricta Tani & Masuda
 Chondria expansa Okamura
 Chondria filiformis C.Agardh
 Chondria flexicaulis Taylor
 Chondria floridana (F.S.Collins) M.A.Howe
 Chondria foliifera (J.Agardh ) Falkenberg
 Chondria forsteri (Mertens ex Turner) C.Agardh
 Chondria furcata C.Agardh
 Chondria fusifolia (Hooker & Harvey) Harvey
 Chondria glandulifera Kützing
 Chondria glomerata Kützing
 Chondria hamulosa (Esper) C.Agardh
 Chondria hapteroclada C.K.Tseng
 Chondria harveyana (J.Agardh) De Toni
 Chondria hieroglyphica Gordon-Mills & Womersley
 Chondria hypnoides Børgesen
 Chondria hypoglossoides F.Schmitz
 Chondria incrassata (J.Agardh) Gordon-Mills & Womersley
 Chondria incurva Gordon-Mills & Womersley
 Chondria infestans (A.H.S.Lucas) A.J.K.Millar
 Chondria intertexta P.C.Silva
 Chondria intricata Okamura
 Chondria iridescens Lucas
 Chondria lanceolata Harvey
 Chondria lancifolia Okamura
 Chondria laxa (R.Brown ex Turner) C.Agardh
 Chondria leptacremon (Melvill ex G.Murray) De Toni
 Chondria littoralis Harvey
 Chondria macrocarpa Harvey
 Chondria mageshimensis Tanaka & K.Nozawa
 Chondria mairei G.Feldmann
 Chondria minutula Weber-van Bosse
 Chondria minutula Noda
 Chondria muscoides C.Agardh
 Chondria muscoides var. turneri C.Agardh
 Chondria myriopoda Gordon-Mills & Millar
 Chondria nana C.Agardh
 Chondria nidifica Harvey
 Chondria nodae M.J.Wynne
 Chondria obtusa var. virgata C.Agardh
 Chondria obtusa var. gracilis Martens
 Chondria obtusa var. paniculata Martens
 Chondria obtusa var. paniculata C.Agardh
 Chondria obtusa var. patentiramea Montagne
 Chondria obtusa (Hudson) C.Agardh
 Chondria obtusa var. gracilis C.Agardh
 Chondria oppositiclada E.Y.Dawson
 Chondria opuntia J.Agardh
 Chondria opuntia (Goodenough & Woodward) C.Agardh
 Chondria opuntioides (Harvey) Harvey
 Chondria ovalifolia (J.Agardh) De Toni
 Chondria ovalis var. obovata C.Agardh
 Chondria papillosa C.Agardh
 Chondria parvula C.Agardh
 Chondria pellucida Y.-P.Lee
 Chondria pinnatifida (Hudson) C.Agardh
 Chondria pinnatifida var. elata C.Agardh
 Chondria platyclada P.[J.L.] Dangeard
 Chondria platyclada W.R.Taylor
 Chondria platyramea A.B.Joly & Ugadim
 Chondria polyrhiza F.S.Collins & Hervey
 Chondria pumila Vickers
 Chondria pungens Schousboe
 Chondria pusilla Delle Chiaje
 Chondria pusilla (Stackhouse) W.J.Hooker
 Chondria pygmaea Garbary & Vandermeulen
 Chondria rainfordii Lucas
 Chondria ramentacea C.Agardh
 Chondria ramosissima Lindenberg
 Chondria ramulosa Lindenberg
 Chondria repanda Schousboe
 Chondria repens Børgesen
 Chondria riparia (J.Agardh) De Toni
 Chondria rubra Harvey
 Chondria ryukyuensis Yamada
 Chondria sanguinea 
 Chondria scintillans G.Feldmann
 Chondria secundata (J.Agardh) De Toni
 Chondria sedifolia Harvey
 Chondria seticulosa (Forsskål) C.Agardh
 Chondria sibogae Weber-van Bosse
 Chondria simpliciuscula Weber-van Bosse
 Chondria stolonifera Okamura
 Chondria striolata C.Agardh
 Chondria subfasciculata (J.Agardh) Gordon-Mills & Womersley
 Chondria subsecunda Gordon-Mills & Womersley
 Chondria succulenta (J.Agardh) Falkenberg
 Chondria suprabulbosa Gordon-Mills & Womersley
 Chondria tenuissima var. striolata (C.Agardh) Schiffner
 Chondria tenuissima var. baileyana (Montagne) Farlow
 Chondria tenuissima var. uncinata (Zanardini) De Toni
 Chondria tenuissima (Withering) C.Agardh- type
 Chondria tenuissima f. californica Collins
 Chondria tenuissima f. divergens Hauck
 Chondria tenuissima var. minuta C.Agardh
 Chondria transversalis Børgesen
 Chondria tumulosa  A.R.Sherwood et J.M.Huisman
 Chondria umbellula Harvey
 Chondria usnea (R.Brown ex Turner) C.Agardh
 Chondria uvaria (J.A.Murray) C.Agardh
 Chondria vermicularis 
 Chondria verticillata Harvey
 Chondria viticulosa A.J.K.Millar & M.J.Wynne
 Chondria wrightii (Turner) C.Agardh
 Chondria xishaensis J.-F.Xhang & B.-M.Xia

References

Rhodomelaceae
Red algae genera
Taxa named by Carl Adolph Agardh